James R. Hartley was an MLA for Carleton County, New Brunswick from 1867 to 1868. He was also a member of the Senate of the University of New Brunswick. He was a resident of Woodstock.

He was influential in selecting the route of the Intercolonial Railway in New Brunswick.

He died at the Brayley House, Fredericton, on September 29, 1868, of typhoid fever.

In 1874, the town of Hartland was named to honour him.

References 

1833 births
Members of the Legislative Assembly of New Brunswick
Canadian surveyors
Canadian civil engineers
1868 deaths
Deaths from typhoid fever
People from Woodstock, New Brunswick
Conservative Party of Canada politicians